National Lampoon's Favorite Deadly Sins is a 1995 comedy TV-film. It is a trilogy of short episodes about the foundation of show business: Lust, Greed and Anger. It stars Andrew Clay, Denis Leary and Joe Mantegna. Lust was written by Leary's wife, Ann Lembeck. It is the directorial debut of Denis Leary. It was nominated for Best Casting for TV Nighttime Special: Artios award in Casting Society of America. The movie was shot in Los Angeles, California and New York City.  Denis Leary won Best Directing in Comedy CableACE Award for this film.

References

External links
 

1995 films
1995 television films
1995 comedy films
National Lampoon films
American comedy films
Films scored by Christopher Tyng
1995 directorial debut films
1990s English-language films
1990s American films